The eta and eta prime meson are isosinglet mesons made of a mixture of up, down and strange quarks and their antiquarks. The charmed eta meson and bottom eta meson are similar forms of quarkonium; they have the same spin and parity as the (light)   defined,  but are made of charm quarks and bottom quarks respectively. The top quark is too heavy to form a similar meson, due to its very fast decay.

General
The eta was discovered in pion–nucleon collisions at the Bevatron in 1961 by A. Pevsner et al. at a time when the proposal of the Eightfold Way was leading to predictions and discoveries of new particles from symmetry considerations.

This " puzzle" can be resolved by the 't Hooft instanton mechanism, whose  realization is also known as the Witten–Veneziano mechanism.

Quark composition
Each quark which appears in an  particle is accompanied by its antiquark, hence all the main quantum numbers are zero, and  the particle overall is "flavourless".

The basic SU(3) symmetry theory of quarks for the three lightest quarks, which only takes into account the strong force, predicts corresponding particles 

and 

However, the electroweak interaction – which can transform one flavour of quark into another – causes a small but significant amount of "mixing" of the eigenstates (with mixing angle  so that the actual quark composition is a linear combination of these formulae. That is:

The  and  particles are closely related to the better-known neutral pion  where

η′ meson
It is a different superposition of the same quarks as the eta meson, as described above, and it has a higher mass, a different decay state, and a shorter lifetime.

Fundamentally, it results from the direct sum decomposition of the approximate SU(3) flavor symmetry among the 3 lightest quarks, where 1 corresponds to η1 before slight quark mixing yields .

See also
 List of mesons
 Quarkonium
 Special unitary group

References

External links
 Eta and Eta' meson summaries at the Particle Data Group

Mesons